Marin (also Romanized as Mārīn and Marīn) is a village in Boyer Ahmad-e Garmsiri Rural District, in the Central District of Gachsaran County, Kohgiluyeh and Boyer-Ahmad Province, Iran. At the 2006 census, its population was 393, in 102 families.

References 

Populated places in Gachsaran County
Tourist attractions in Kohgiluyeh and Boyer-Ahmad Province